The following is the standings of the Iran Football's 1974–75  football season.

Final 

Tractor and Bargh Shiraz promoted to Takht Jamshid Cup 1975–76.

References

See also 
 1974–75 Takht Jamshid Cup

League 2 (Iran) seasons
Iran
2